"Urim and Thummim" is a phrase found in the Hebrew Bible.

Urim may also refer to:
 Ur, an ancient Sumerian city-state
 Urim, Iran
 Urim, Israel
 Urim and Thummim (Latter Day Saints)
 Urim language, spoken in Papua New Guinea
 Urim Publications, an Israeli Jewish publisher
 Urim SIGINT Base, an Israeli intelligence-gathering installation
 Rabbi Jonathan Eybeschutz, author of the Urim ve-Tummim, a legal commentary on the Jewish Code of Law (Shulchan Aruch)